Nishant Shokeen is an Indian film and television actor. He has done several commercial advertisements and television serials. Nishant is currently portraying the role of Lord Krishna in the second season of Zee TV serial Choti Bahu.

Personal life

Nishant was born in Nangloi in Delhi. He did his graduation in Arts in Rohtak, Haryana. He never planned to become an actor but he likes to dance and in a way that led him eventually to television. He had joined Shiamak Davar’s dance classes for a month in Delhi. Shaimak recognized a good dancer in him and advised Nishant to join him professionally in Mumbai. He joined Shaimak’s troop, but soon realized that it was not what he wanted from life. On his friends' advice he subsequently auditioned for roles and entered the glamorous world of television.

Career

His first television show was ‘Miss India’ which was aired on Doordarshan. He got his second serial from Balaji Telefilms called ‘Kitni Mast Hai Zindagi’. He has made himself known in the world of advertisements also by modeling in a very popular advertisement of Hero Honda bikes. His good looks and appeal remained in public memory and then on he has become popular as Hero Honda Boy. He has now been doing pretty good work on television since last few years. Nishant has played varied characters in various serials. He played Dhoti clad simpleton Bhola in Sony’s Durgesh Nandinii. He has played a negative character in NDTV Imagine’s Dehleez and a very positive character in STAR Plus's Thodi Si Zameen Thoda Sa Aasmaan. He has also worked with big ad film makers like Balki and Andy (producer of Hrithik Roshan Reliance Mobile Commercial).

TV serials

 Miss India
 Kitni Mast Hai Zindagi
 Kesar
 K. Street Pali Hill
 Hum Paanch
 Thodi Si Zameen Thoda Sa Aasmaan
 Durgesh Nandinii
 CID Special Bureau
 Akela (episodic)
 Yeh Dil Chahe More
 Simplly Sapney
 Jai Maa Vaishno Devi
 Dehleez
 Bandhan
 Kahaniya Vikram Aur Betaal Ki
 Na Aana Is Des Laado
 Mera Naam Karegi Roshan
 Baat Hamari Pakki Hai
 Adaalat
 Choti Bahu

TV commercials

Nishant's commercial ad work includes: Kaun Banega Crorepati Promo, Breeze Soap, Parle Poppins, Fair One, Kissan Ketchup, Sahara Buniyad Promo, Wheel, Chevrolet Magnum, Hero Honda CD Deluxe with Andy, Iodex, ICICI, Samsung Hero Phone, Aviva Insurance with Sachin Tendulkar, Innova with Aamir Khan etc.

References

Male actors from Delhi
Living people
Indian male television actors
Male actors in Hindi television
Year of birth missing (living people)
Actors from Mumbai